Trachysomus arriagadai is a species of beetle in the family Cerambycidae. It was described by Galileo and Martins in 1991. It is known from Argentina, Brazil and Paraguay.

References

Onciderini
Beetles described in 1991